Love Henrik Samuel Antell (born 24 October 1980) is a Swedish-Finnish singer and artist. As a student he attended Adolf Fredrik's Music School in Stockholm. Antell is known as the frontman of the band Florence Valentin, and as a solo singer. Antell's parents were both from Finland. He grew up in Östermalm in central Stockholm but nowadays resides in Hägersten. He was educated as an illustrator at Konstfack between 2001 and 2007, and he is inspired by Lars Hillersberg. Between 2007 and 2011, Antell was a guitarist in the folk-rock group Perssons Pack. He participated in Mika Ronkainen's drama documentary film "Ingen riktig finne"; the film won first prize in the category Best Nordic Documentary at the Gothenburg Film Festival in 2013.

As an artist, Love Antell has done the cover for author Lena Andersson's book "Duck City" and illustrated Michel Houellebecq's book "Plattform".

Antell was one of the singers in the 2014 season of the TV4 series Så mycket bättre.

Discography

Singles

References

External links

1980 births
Living people
Swedish pop singers
Swedish rock singers
Swedish people of Finnish descent
Swedish-language singers
21st-century Swedish singers